Howard Wood (March 3, 1883 – February 21, 1949) was an American football, basketball, and baseball coach. He served as the head football coach at North Dakota Agricultural College—now known as North Dakota State University—from 1913 to 1914, compiling a record of North Dakota Agricultural College. Wood was also as the head basketball coach at North Dakota Agricultural from 1913 to 1915, amassing a record of 22–4, and the school's head baseball coach in 1915, tallying a mark of 8–7.

Wood was a native of Potsdam, New York and a graduate of Purdue University. He died on February 21, 1949, at a hospital in Sioux Falls, South Dakota.

Head coaching record

College football

References

External links
 

1883 births
1949 deaths
North Dakota State Bison baseball coaches
North Dakota State Bison football coaches
North Dakota State Bison men's basketball coaches
High school basketball coaches in South Dakota
High school football coaches in South Dakota
Purdue University alumni
State University of New York at Potsdam alumni
Sportspeople from Ottawa
People from Potsdam, New York